The University of Bordeaux (French: Université de Bordeaux) is a public university based in Nouvelle-Aquitaine in southwestern France.

It has several campuses in the cities and towns of Bordeaux, Dax, Gradignan, Périgueux, Pessac, and Talence. There are also several smaller teaching sites in various other towns in the region, including in Bayonne.

The University of Bordeaux counts more than 50,000 students, over 6,000 of which are international.

It is a member of the ComUE d'Aquitaine university group.

History

Original formation 
In 286, a university had been created by the Romans. At this time, the city was an important administrative centre and the school had to train administrators. Only rhetoric and grammar were taught (including the study of classical texts).

Modern university 
The original Université de Bordeaux was established by Pope Eugene IV on 7 June 1441 when Bordeaux was an English town. In 1793, during the French Revolution, the National Convention abolished the university. The university re-opened in 1896 as a result of the law of 18 July 1896. In 1970, the university was split into three universities: Bordeaux 1, Bordeaux 2, and Bordeaux 3. In 1995, Bordeaux 4 split off from Bordeaux 1. Since 2014, the aforementioned universities have been reunited to form the University of Bordeaux, except for Bordeaux 3, which did not take part in the merger and remains independent of the University of Bordeaux.

Notable alumni

Academia 
 Geoffrey Keating (c. 1569–c. 1644), Irish historian
 Léon Duguit (1859–1928), French scholar of public law
 Henri Moysset (1875–1949), French historian and politician
 Jacques Ellul (1912–1994), French philosopher, sociologist, lay theologian, and professor
 James Joll (1918–1994), British historian and university lecturer
 Julio Cotler (1932–2019), Peruvian anthropologist and sociologist
 Théophile Obenga (b. 1936), Congolese Egyptologist
 Spencer C. Tucker (b. 1937), American military historian 
 Charles Butterworth (b. 1938), American political philosopher
 Helene Hagan (b. 1939), Moroccan–American anthropologist and Amazigh activist
 Pascal Salin (b. 1939), French economist and professor
 Marie-France Vignéras (b. 1946), French mathematician
 Alfredo Co (b. 1949), Filipino Sinologist 
 Idowu Bantale Omole (b. 1954), Nigerian professor and academic administrator
 Abderrahmane Hadj-Salah (1928–2017), Algerian linguist
 Roger Naslain (b. 1936), professor of chemical and physical science at the University of Bordeaux

Activism 
 Aubrey Willis Williams (1890–1965), American social and civil rights activist
 Jean-Claude Bajeux (1931–2011), Haitian political activist and professor
 Louis Clayton Jones (1935–2006), African-American international attorney and civil rights leader

Business 
 Mireille Gillings (b. 1971), French Canadian neurobiologist and entrepreneur
 Olivier Le Peuch (born 1963/1964), French businessman, CEO of Schlumberger

Law 
 Thomas Barclay (c. 1570–1632), Scottish jurist and professor
 Ba Maw (1893–1977), Burmese politician
 James Marshall Sprouse (1923–2004), United States Circuit judge

Literature and journalism 
 François Mauriac (1885–1970) French novelist, dramatist, critic, poet, journalist and Nobel Laureate
 Saint-John Perse (1887–1975), French poet-diplomat，Nobel Prize-winning (1960)
 Lucien Xavier Michel-Andrianarahinjaka (1929–1997), Malagasy writer, poet and politician
 Annie Ernaux(b. 1940),  Nobel Prize-winning(2022) French writer and professor of literature.
 Esther Seligson (1941–2010), Mexican writer, poet, translator, and historian
 Lee Mallory (b. 1946), American poet, editor and academic
 Marc Saikali (b. 1965), Lebanese–French journalist
 Sarah Ladipo Manyika (b. 1969), British Nigerian writer

Performing arts 
 Luc Plissonneau (b. 1961), French screenwriter and film director
 Morteza Heidari (b. 1968), Iranian TV presenter

Politics 
 Jean Baptiste Gay, vicomte de Martignac (1778–1832), French statesman 
 Jean Ybarnégaray (1883–1956), Basque–French politician
 Jean-Fernand Audeguil (1887–1956), French politician 
Ba Maw (1893–1977), Head of State of Burma
 Michel Kafando (b. 1942), Burkinabé diplomat
 Xavier Darcos (b. 1947), French politician, scholar, civil servant and former Minister of Labour
 Jean-Paul Gonzalez (b. 1947), French virologist
 Mario Aoun (b. 1951), Lebanese politician
 Alain Vidalies (b. 1951), the French Secretary of State for Transport, the Sea and Fisheries
 Nagoum Yamassoum (b. 1954), Chadian politician and former Prime Minister of Chad
 Anicet-Georges Dologuélé (b. 1957), Central African politician 
 Reza Taghipour (b. 1957), Iranian conservative politician 
 Thierry Santa (b. 1967), French Polynesian politician in New Caledonia
 Germaine Kouméalo Anaté (b. 1968), Togolese government minister, scholar and writer
 Olivier Falorni (b. 1972), French politician
 Myriam El Khomri (b. 1978), French politician

Sciences 
 Joseph-Ignace Guillotin (1738–1814), French physician, politician and freemason and namesake of the guillotine
 Célestin Sieur (1860–1955), French physician
 Charles-Joseph Marie Pitard (1873–1927), French pharmacist and botanist
 Pierre-Paul Grassé (1895–1985), French zoologist
 Émile Peynaud (1912–2004), French oenologist
 Laure Gatet (1913–1943), French pharmacist, biochemist and spy
 Basile Adjou Moumouni (1922–2019), Beninese physician
 Roland Paskoff (1933–2005), French geologist
 Jean-Marie Tarascon (b. 1953), French chemist and professor
 Bruno Vallespir (b. 1960), French engineer and professor

Sports 
 Jean-Pierre Escalettes (b. 1935), French retired footballer
 Karounga Keïta (b. 1941), Malian football official and former coach and player
 Bixente Lizarazu (b. 1969), Basque–French retired footballer

Visual arts 
 Charles James (1906–1978), English-American fashion designer

Winemaking 
 Emma Gao

See also 
 List of medieval universities
École nationale supérieure des sciences agronomiques de Bordeaux Aquitaine

References

Literature 
 International Dictionary of University Histories, Routledge, 2013, pp. 429–431.

 
University of Bordeaux
Educational institutions established in the 15th century
1441 establishments in Europe
1440s establishments in France
Forestry education
Universities and colleges formed by merger in France